Pimelea macrostegia is a species of flowering plant in the family Thymelaeaceae and is endemic to Kangaroo Island in South Australia. It is a shrub with glabrous, narrowly elliptic leaves and clusters of pale yellow flowers surrounded by 4 or 6 egg-shaped, pale green involucral bracts.

Description
Flowering occurs from November to February.

Taxonomy
This pimelea was first formally described in 1873 by George Bentham, who gave it the name Pimelea ligustrina var. macrostegia in Flora Australiensis, based on specimens collected in "sandy scrub" on Kangaroo Island by Frederick George Waterhouse. In 1925, John McConnell Black raised the variety to species status as Pimelea macrostegia in Transactions and Proceedings of the Royal Society of South Australia. The specific epithet (macrostegia) means "large roofed".

Distribution and habitat
Pimelea macrostegia grows in sandy scrub or shrubland on Kangaroo Island in South Australia.

References

macrostegia
Malvales of Australia
Taxa named by George Bentham
Plants described in 1873
Flora of Kangaroo Island